
Malone is an unincorporated community located in Fond du Lac County, Wisconsin near the Sheboygan River and Mt. Calvary, in the towns of Marshfield, and Taycheedah. Malone is located in The Holyland region of Wisconsin. It is home to a post office.

History
Malone was a stop on the Sheboygan & Fond du Lac Railroad. Originally named St. John, it was renamed Malone after the railroad official H. T. Malone. A post office called Malone has been in operation since 1877.

The Malone Area Heritage Museum provides an in-depth look at Malone's culturally diverse history as a railroad town throughout the 19th and 20th centuries. In 2005, the museum moved the original train depot across the street and began restoring it.

Notable people
John Durham - Medal of Honor recipient

Images

References

Unincorporated communities in Fond du Lac County, Wisconsin
Unincorporated communities in Wisconsin